Steve Gillespie (born August 2, 1985 in Brecksville, Ohio) is an American soccer player who most recently played on the Cleveland Freeze in the PASL. Gillespie has experience playing in the MLS, USL First Division, PASL Pro and the PDL.

Career

College and amateur
Gillespie attended Brecksville-Broadview Heights High School and played college soccer at Mount Union College, where he was the 2007 Ohio Athletic Conference Midfielder of the Year, was named to All-Great Lakes Region First Team & All-Ohio Athletic Conference First Teams in 2007, the All-Ohio Athletic Conference Second Team in 2006, and was a two-time Mount Union soccer MVP in 2006 and 2007. In 2007, Gillespie was nominated for All-American.

During his college years he also played with Cleveland Internationals in the USL Premier Development League.

Professional
After spending the 2008 season playing with the Columbus Crew reserves, Gillespie joined the Cleveland City Stars of the USL First Division on April 20, 2009. He later signed with the Ohio Vortex on November 12, 2009 of the PASL where he played four seasons and was captain for two years. During the 2010/11 season, Gillespie finished 5th in the league in assists with 17 overall after playing in 13 games. In the following season, Gillespie scored 14 goals and added 14 assists.

During the 2013/2014 season, Gillespie signed for the Cleveland Freeze of the PASL. During the regular season, in 15 games played, he finished with 12 goals and 15 assists for 27 points. During the team's playoff run, he led the league in points, finishing with 11 that came from 6 goals and 5 assists in 4 games.

References

External links
 Cleveland City Stars bio
 Mount Union College bio

1985 births
Living people
American soccer players
Cleveland City Stars players
Cleveland Internationals players
Columbus Crew players
USL League Two players
USL First Division players
University of Mount Union alumni
People from Brecksville, Ohio
Association football midfielders
Soccer players from Ohio